Santa Lucía de la Sierra, nicknamed Santa Lucía or La Sierra, is a community south of the Valparaíso Municipality, Zacatecas, located near the border between the Mexican States of Jalisco and Zacatecas.

It is located 81 km from Huejuquilla El Alto, Jalisco and 123 km from Valparaíso, it had a population of 891 inhabitants during the 2020 Mexico Census.

References 

Populated places in Zacatecas